Nathanaël Ruben Saintini (born 30 May 2000) is a Guadeloupean professional footballer who plays as a centre-back for FC Sion. A former youth international for France, he plays for the Guadeloupe national team

Career
Saintini is a youth product of the Guadeloupean club MJC des Abymes, and continued his development in mainland France with the youth academies of CASC Ouillins-Lyon, Saint-Priest and Montpellier. He began his senior career with Montpellier reserves, before moving to SO Cholet in the Championnat National. He transferred to FC Sion on 8 January 2019.

Saintini spent the 2020–21 season on loan with the Luxembourgian club Union Titus Pétange. He made his professional debut with Sion in a 1–0 Swiss Super League win over BSC Young Boys on 7 August 2021.

International career
Born in the French overseas department of Guadeloupe, Saintini represented the France U18s twice in 2018. He debuted for the Guadeloupe national team in a friendly 2–0 loss to Cape Verde on 23 March 2022.

References

External links
 
 SFL Profile
 FFF Profile

2000 births
Living people
People from Les Abymes
Guadeloupean footballers
Guadeloupe international footballers
French footballers
French expatriate footballers
France youth international footballers
French people of Guadeloupean descent
Association football defenders
AS Saint-Priest players
Montpellier HSC players
SO Cholet players
FC Sion players
Union Titus Pétange players
Swiss Super League players
Luxembourg National Division players
Championnat National players
Championnat National 2 players
Championnat National 3 players
French expatriate sportspeople in Switzerland
French expatriate sportspeople in Luxembourg
Expatriate footballers in Switzerland
Expatriate footballers in Luxembourg